Victor Emanuel Rapp (27 April 1881 – 3 July 1944) was an Australian rules footballer who played with Carlton in the Victorian Football League (VFL).

Notes

External links 

Victor Rapp's profile at Blueseum

1881 births
1944 deaths
Australian rules footballers from Victoria (Australia)
Carlton Football Club players